The Order of the Lithuanian Grand Duke Gediminas is the Lithuanian Presidential Award which was re-instituted to honour the citizens of Lithuania for outstanding performance in civil and public offices. Foreign nationals may also be awarded this Order. The Order of the Lithuanian Grand Duke Gediminas was instituted in 1928. It features the Columns of Gediminas, one of the national symbols of Lithuania.

Classes
The Order of the Lithuanian Grand Duke Gediminas has five classes:

Notable recipients
The first five persons awarded the Order of the Lithuanian Grand Duke Gediminas after the restoration of the Independent State of Lithuania in 1991 were poets Justinas Marcinkevičius, Bernardas Brazdžionis, priest Ričardas Mikutavičius, painter Vytautas Kazimieras Jonynas and mathematician Jonas Kubilius.

Other notable recipients
Edvard Beneš, Czech politician and President of Czechoslovakia
Elena Bonner, physician, Soviet human rights activist, writer, wife of Andrei Sakharov
Algirdas Budrys, clarinetist
Christopher Cox, former U.S. Representative
Štefan Füle, Czech politician and diplomat
James L. Jones, retired United States National Security Advisor and Commandant of the Marine Corps
Jacek Kuroń, Polish historian and politician
Ina Marčiulionytė, Ambassador and Permanent Delegate of the Republic of Lithuania to UNESCO
George Robertson, Baron Robertson of Port Ellen, tenth Secretary General of the North Atlantic Treaty Organization
Mstislav Rostropovich, cellist
Juan Antonio Samaranch, former President of the International Olympic Committee
George Soros, philanthropist
Antanina Vainiūnaitė-Kubertavičienė, Lithuanian actress
Albrecht Freiherr von Boeselager, Grand Chancellor of the Sovereign Military Order of Malta
Arvydas Každailis, Lithuanian artist

Images of order insignia

References

External links
Order of the Lithuanian Grand Duke Gediminas

Recipients of the Order of the Lithuanian Grand Duke Gediminas
Lithuanian Grand Duke Gediminas
1928 establishments in Lithuania
Lithuanian Grand Duke Gediminas, Order of the
Awards established in 1928

lt:Lietuvos didžiojo kunigaikščio Gedimino ordino medalis